Aristide Berto Cianfarani (August 3, 1895 – February 19, 1960) was an Italian born American sculptor noted for his monuments, war memorials and ecclesiastical works.

Biography
Cianfarani was born in Italy in 1895 and emigrated to the United States in 1913. He studied at the Rhode Island School of Design as well as in France and Italy. He worked for the Gorham Manufacturing Company in 1917 and 1919, and the International Silver Company from 1923 to 1925. He started his own studio in Providence, Rhode Island in 1926.

Selected works
West Virginia State Memorial, also known as the Major Arza Goodspeed bust, Vicksburg National Military Park, 1922
Bowen R. Church statue, Roger Williams Park, Providence, Rhode Island, 1928
Prince Henry the Navigator statue, Fall River, Massachusetts, 1940
General Peter Muhlenberg statue, Muhlenberg College, 1941
Statue of John V. Power, Worcester, Massachusetts, 1947
Testudo (mascot statue), University of Maryland, 1933,

References

External links

20th-century American sculptors
American male sculptors
1895 births
1960 deaths
Burials in Rhode Island
Artists from Providence, Rhode Island
Italian emigrants to the United States
20th-century American male artists